David "Dave" Reid (born 21 April 1987) is a Scottish curler and curling coach.

At the national level, he is a two-time Scottish men's champion curler (2014, 2015).

Teams

Men's

Mixed

Record as a coach of national teams

References

External links

Living people
1987 births
Scottish male curlers
Scottish curling champions
Scottish curling coaches
Place of birth missing (living people)